Events in the year 1853 in Norway.

Incumbents
Monarch: Oscar I

Events
24 August – The Royal Norwegian Navy Museum is founded.
The present Lista Lighthouse was built.

Arts and literature

Notable births
22 January – Francis Hagerup, lawyer, diplomat, politician, and twice Prime Minister of Norway (died 1921)
28 March – Jacob Breda Bull, author (died 1930)
14 October – Axel Christian Zetlitz Kielland, civil servant and diplomat (died 1924)
26 October – Kristian Vilhelm Koren Schjelderup, Sr., bishop (died 1913)
3 November – Hans Nilsen Hauge, priest, politician and Minister (died 1931)

Full date unknown
Johan Magnus Halvorsen, politician (died 1922)
Just Knud Qvigstad, politician and Minister (died 1957)

Notable deaths
1 January – Valentin Christian Wilhelm Sibbern, government minister (born 1779).
23 June - Herman Garmann (born 1787), businessman and merchant.
3 July - Johan Gørbitz, painter (born 1782)
3 October – Hans Jacob Arnold Jensen, military officer and politician (born 1777)

Full date unknown
Edvard Hagerup, solicitor and politician (born 1781)
Peter Andreas Munch, historian (born 1810)

See also

References